Hugh Geoghegan (born 16 May 1938) is a retired Irish judge who served as a Judge of the Supreme Court from 2000 to 2010 and a Judge of the High Court from 1992 to 2000.

Early life 
Geoghegan was born in 1938. His father James Geoghegan was a judge of the Supreme Court. He attended secondary school at Clongowes Wood College and received BCL and LLB degrees from University College Dublin. At UCD he was the auditor of the University College Dublin Law Society between 1960 and 1961. He studied at the King's Inns in order to become a barrister.

Legal career 
He was called to the Bar in 1962, becoming a senior counsel in 1977, practising in Dublin and the Midland Circuit. He was also called to the bar in Northern Ireland and in England and Wales.

Geoghegan was a Public Service Arbitrator from 1982 to 1992. In the 1980s he served on the Circuit Court Rules Committee. He also appeared before the tribunal of inquiry into the Stardust fire. He chaired a commission which recommended the formation of the Labour Relations Commission.

He is a bencher of Middle Temple.

Judicial career 
Geoghegan was appointed to the High Court in December 1992. He was elevated to the Supreme Court of Ireland in 2000, replacing Donal Barrington. He was appointed on 7 March 2000. He retired in May 2010 and was replaced by Liam McKechnie.

In his retirement he has presided over citizenship ceremonies.

Personal life 
He is married to Mary Finlay Geoghegan who also served as a judge of the Supreme Court, with whom he has two daughters and a son.

References 

1938 births
Living people
Irish barristers
Judges of the Supreme Court of Ireland
High Court judges (Ireland)
People educated at Clongowes Wood College
Alumni of University College Dublin
Alumni of King's Inns